Splendrillia bartschi is a species of sea snail, a marine gastropod mollusk in the family Drilliidae.

Description
The shell grows to a length of 11 mm.

Distribution
This species occurs in the Atlantic Ocean off Bermuda.

References

  Tucker, J.K. 2004 Catalog of recent and fossil turrids (Mollusca: Gastropoda). Zootaxa 682:1–1295.

External links
  Fallon P.J. (2016). Taxonomic review of tropical western Atlantic shallow water Drilliidae (Mollusca: Gastropoda: Conoidea) including descriptions of 100 new species. Zootaxa. 4090(1): 1–363
 

bartschi
Gastropods described in 1941